Dycladia marmana is a moth of the subfamily Arctiinae. It was described by Schaus in 1924. It is found in Guyana.

References

Euchromiina
Moths described in 1924